KTMZ (1220 AM) is a commercial radio station licensed to Pomona, California. Owned by Lotus Communications, KTMZ operates as a simulcast of Los Angeles-licensed KWKW, carrying that station's Spanish-language sports format as an affiliate of TUDN Radio.

History
The station began broadcasting December 23, 1960 as KKAR. It ran 250 watts, during daytime hours only, and was owned by Intrastate Broadcasters. The station was initially intended to offer "FM listening on AM radio", with a "good music" format.

Intrastate sold KKAR to West Coast Communications, Inc. in late 1966; the $160,000 sale closed on January 1, 1967. Under West Coast, the station flipped to a Top 40 format. In late 1970, Elizabeth Schirmer, a former employee of KFMB-TV San Diego, acquired KKAR for $250,000. The ownership and format wheels spun again in 1973 when the station flipped to country on February 24 and the Schirmers sold the station to Bassett Broadcasting. In 1976, it began airing a Latin contemporary format after being purchased by JATO Communications; Bassett asked to sell the station before the then-required three-year period, citing its poor financial condition.

In 1978, JATO acquired KSOM-AM-FM and was required to spin off the 1220 frequency as a result. The KKAR intellectual unit moved to 1510 kHz as KNSE; at the same time, Gore Broadcasting, Inc., acquired the frequency and relaunched it as a religious outlet, KLIT. In 1983, its call sign was changed to KTSJ. Several groups owned KLIT/KTSJ during its tenure as a religious outlet, including Creative Communications of Pomona and American Sunrise Communications.

KTSJ continued airing a religious format until 1994, when it adopted a Spanish hits format.

In 1996, the station’s call sign was changed to KWPA after Personal Achievement Radio bought the station from American Sunrise for $875,000. (Personal Achievement briefly held the call letters KWPA, KXPA and KYPA, all in Los Angeles, for the stations it owned.) However, KWPA only briefly simulcast KYPA; in 1997, it shifted to a gold-based Spanish adult contemporary format as "Radio Mía" and attempted to secure the call letters KMIA. Multicultural Broadcasting would acquire KWPA and KYPA in 1997.

Spanish-language sports

Lotus acquired KWPA from Multicultural at the end of 1999 for $750,000. In 2000, KWPA became KWKU, and it began simulcasting Lotus's Spanish-language sports outlet KWKW, improving reception in Pomona and Ontario, in addition to serving as an overflow station for KWKW sports coverage; KWKU also exclusively carried broadcasts of the Los Angeles Sparks of the WNBA.

The KWKU nominal main studio in Pomona would prove critical to getting KWKW back on the air after disaster struck on December 6, 2001. A major fire at the Sunset Vine Tower, which was home to the Lotus cluster, caused extensive electrical damage to the building, which was deemed unsafe by fire officials. 105 computers, mixers and other equipment were carted out of the building, and John Cooper, the chief engineer for Lotus Los Angeles, drove them to Pomona, where the station was back on the air in six hours. As a result of the extensive damage, Lotus relocated temporarily to the recently vacated KTNQ studios and later purchased a building near Universal Studios Hollywood to be fitted out for its operation.

In 2015, its call sign was changed to KTMZ.

References

External links

TMZ
Lotus Communications stations
TMZ
Sports radio stations in the United States
Radio stations established in 1960
1960 establishments in California